Ganjgah (also Romanized as Ganjgāh; also known as Janchāy, Jandchāi, Jand Chāy, Jandchāy, and Kandzha) is a village in Sanjabad-e Gharbi Rural District of the Central District of Kowsar County, Ardabil province, Iran. At the 2006 census, its population was 750 in 175 households. The following census in 2011 counted 948 people in 237 households. The latest census in 2016 showed a population of 685 people in 194 households; it was the largest village in its rural district.

External links 
Tageo

References 

Kowsar County

Towns and villages in Kowsar County

Populated places in Ardabil Province

Populated places in Kowsar County